Fortissimo is a term in music dynamics meaning "to be played very loudly." 

Fortissimo may also refer to: 
 Fortissimo Records, a records label
 Fortissimo Films, a distribution and production company that focuses on independent and Asian cinema
 Fortissimo space, a concept in topology
 "Fortissimo" (song), a 1966 song of Rita Pavone